Class 95 is an English radio station of Mediacorp in Singapore. It is a 24-hour radio station that plays music from the 1990s to the present day, primarily competing with Kiss92. For over 20 consecutive years, Class 95FM is the number one English radio station in Singapore. In the latest Nielsen Radio survey results released on 22 November 2018, Class 95 FM has clinched the position of the number 1 radio station in Singapore in the first time of radio history with the only station to have over 801,000 weekly listeners.

Class 95's studio moved out of Caldecott Broadcast Centre on 17 January 2017 and it started broadcasting from the brand new Mediacorp Campus, Mediapolis @ one-north, on the same day.

Content

Music
Class 95 adopts the Adult contemporary radio format, with the majority of the playlist consisting of music from the 1990s, 2000s, 2010s, primarily competing with Kiss92.

On weekday nights, Love Songs features ballads, soft rock and easy listening hits. Throughout the weekend, Triple Play Weekend features 3 songs in a row with a particular theme. On Sunday evenings, #Throwback features retro tunes from the late 1980s and early 1990s.

News and current affairs
News, sports, and traffic bulletins on Class 95 generally air at the top of the hour, while the weather bulletin is aired at around 30 minutes past the hour.

The traffic updates are aired at about 10-minute intervals in the mornings and evenings (6-10am, 5-8pm), and hourly intervals during lunch (12-2pm).

The news bulletin is provided by radio station CNA938(93.8Mhz). Prior to November 2017, the news bulletin was only aired during primetime hours (6-9am, 12-2pm, 5-8pm). In November 2017, Mediacorp mandated the news bulletin to be aired every hour. On weekdays, the news is aired hourly from 7:00am to 9:00pm, while on weekends the news is aired hourly from 10:00am to 7:00pm.

Prior to April 2018, the commercial breaks were at :10, :22, :40, :52 minutes past the hour, and the news bulletin was aired at the :52 break. In April 2018, the commercials were moved to :15, :30, :45, :58 on weekdays, and the news bulletin was pushed forward to the top of the hour after the :58 break.

See also
List of radio stations in Singapore

References
https://www.channelnewsasia.com/news/singapore/mediacorp-number-one-radio-network-in-singapore-nielsen-10958706

External links
CLASS 95's Official website

Radio stations in Singapore
Radio stations established in 1990
1990 establishments in Singapore